

392001–392100 

|-bgcolor=#f2f2f2
| colspan=4 align=center | 
|}

392101–392200 

|-id=120
| 392120 Heidiursula ||  || Heidi Ursula Wallon Pizarro (born 1971), spouse of the discoverer Michael Todd. || 
|-id=142
| 392142 Solheim ||  || Jan Erik Solheim (born 1938), Norwegian astronomer. || 
|}

392201–392300 

|-id=225
| 392225 Lanzarote ||  || Lanzarote is a volcanic island, one of the seven Canary Islands in the Atlantic Ocean. || |}

 392301–392400 

|-bgcolor=#f2f2f2
| colspan=4 align=center | |}

 392401–392500 

|-bgcolor=#f2f2f2
| colspan=4 align=center | |}

 392501–392600 

|-bgcolor=#f2f2f2
| colspan=4 align=center | |}

 392601–392700 

|-id=655
| 392655 Fengmin ||  || Feng Min (born 1940), a researcher of Chinese Academy of Sciences, is an expert in the modern application of traditional Chinese medicine. He led the team that was the first to extract Ganoderma lucidum spore oil. || 
|}

 392701–392800 

|-id=728
| 392728 Zdzisławłączny ||  || Zdzisław Łączny (born 1947), who has demonstrated an extraordinary knowledge, help and kindness in the construction of astronomical observatories. He is a Polish electronics engineer and designer of the electronic components that allowed the automation and remote control of Rantiga Osservatorio. || 
|}

 392801–392900 

|-bgcolor=#f2f2f2
| colspan=4 align=center | |}

 392901–393000 

|-bgcolor=#f2f2f2
| colspan=4 align=center | ''
|}

References 

392001-393000